Mehran (also Romanized as Mehrān) is a village in Bala Taleqan Rural District, in the Central District of Taleqan County, Alborz Province, Iran. At the 2006 census, its population was 347, in 116 families.

References 

Populated places in Taleqan County